is a 1958 Japanese drama film directed by Mikio Naruse. It is based on a novel by Saisei Murō.

Plot
Kyoko, daughter of successful writer Hirayama, rejects several marriage prospects before taking Ryokichi, owner of a small used book store, as her husband. A few years into the marriage, Kyoko has to start selling parts of the household, as the manuscripts of Ryokichi, who is ambitious to become a novelist, keep getting returned by publishers. Yagihara, a magazine editor and acquaintance of Hirayama, outspokenly tells Ryokichi that his work lacks originality and an elaborate style. Kyoko suggests that Ryokichi shows his manuscripts to her father, but he declines, arguing that it is Hirayama's overpowering presence which hinders him in his writing. Ryokichi's behaviour becomes increasingly erratic due to his drinking, and the couple's financial and emotional situation worsens. Kyoko repeatedly leaves her home to stay at her father's place, but insists that a divorce is the final resort. When Kyoko again returns to Ryokichi, the mother asks Hirayama if they shouldn't split up. Hirayama replies, only when Kyoko comes home exhausted and can't go on anymore, the time to split up has come.

Cast
 Sō Yamamura as Heishiro Hirayama
 Kyōko Kagawa as Kyoko
 Isao Kimura as Ryokichi, Kyoko's husband
 Shizue Natsukawa as Rieko, Hirayama's wife
 Hiroshi Tachikawa as Heinosuke, Hirayama's son
 Chieko Nakakita as Sumiko Urushiyama
 Mina Mitsui as Risako Yamamoto
 Nobuo Nakamura as Toshio Yagihara
 Keiju Kobayashi as Tayama
 Daisuke Katō as Suga, the poet
 Natsuko Kahara as Enko Murai
 Sadako Sawamura as Mrs. Hatoi
 Kenji Sahara as Mrs. Hatoi's son
 Hiroshi Hayashi as Dr. Sato
 Minoru Chiaki as Saburo Yoshida
 Teruko Mita as Sachiko Yoshida
 Yoshio Tsuchiya as Ishima
 Yū Fujiki as Okada

Reception
In his 2005 review for Slant Magazine, Keith Uhlich called Anzukko "a loving portrait of a woman tragically caught between her wants and her responsibilities, fated to tread a potentially never-ending path between the trials of her marriage and the refuge of her past."

References

External links
 

1958 films
1958 drama films
Japanese drama films
Japanese black-and-white films
Films based on Japanese novels
Films directed by Mikio Naruse
Toho films
1950s Japanese films